Fantasia: Live in Tokyo is a double live album by British rock band Asia, released on 21 June 2007 in Japan by WHD Entertainment and on 26 June 2007 internationally by Eagle Records.

Track listing

Personnel

Asia
 John Wetton – lead vocals, bass, acoustic guitar
 Steve Howe – guitars, backing vocals
 Geoff Downes – keyboards, backing vocals
 Carl Palmer – drums

Technical personnel
 Steve Rispin – audio mixing engineer (at Liscombe Park Studios, Buckinghamshire)
 Ray Staff – mastering engineer (at Alchemy Studios, London)
 Roger Dean – artwork, logotype, font
 Mike Inns – photography

Charts

References

Asia (band) albums
2007 live albums
Eagle Records live albums
Albums with cover art by Roger Dean (artist)